Esporte Clube Comercial, is a football club based in Cornélio Procópio in the south Brazilian state of Paraná. 

The club, founded on March 14, 1943, is best known for having the state championship of Paraná of 1961 following two wins in the regional championships of north Paraná in 1958 and 1961.

Comercial play their home games at Estádio Ubirajara Medeiros which has a maximum capacity of 6,000 people.

Honours
 Campeonato Paranaense: 1961
 Championship of North Paraná: 1958, 1961

References 
 Tiago Piontekievicz: Em 1961 o Leão do Norte rugiu mais alto e assustou os adversários – Comercial, campeão paranaense, Redação em Campo, 2011-11-26.
 Comercial/PR, Futebol Nacional, 2007-03-20.

Association football clubs established in 1943
Football clubs in Paraná (state)
1943 establishments in Brazil
Cornélio Procópio